Wojciech Kocyan is a Polish pianist. He is most well known for his performances of Chopin, and for his 2001 album, which was named as one of the 50 best classical recordings ever made by Gramophone in 2007. Kocyan earned a master's degree with John Perry at the University of Southern California, where he also received his doctorate. In addition to being a laureate to several international piano competitions, Kocyan is currently an artist in residence at Loyola Marymount University in Los Angeles, California.

Discography 
 2001: Wojciech Kocyan Plays Skriabin, Prokofiew, Rachmaninow
 2003: Hommage à Carlos Guastavino
 2005: Reflets dans Chopin: Wojciech Kocyan Plays Liszt, Mompou, Schumann, Saya
 Wojciech Kocyan plays Robert Schumann (1810-1856)

References

External links
Professor Wojciech Kocyan, biography at Paderewski Music Society

Living people
Polish classical pianists
Male classical pianists
University of Southern California alumni
21st-century classical pianists
Year of birth missing (living people)
21st-century male musicians